Thomas Joseph McCarthy (born 4 Oct, 1905 in Goderich, Ontario) was a Canadian clergyman and bishop for the Roman Catholic Diocese of Nelson, and later for Roman Catholic Diocese of Saint Catharines. He became ordained in 1929. He was appointed bishop in 1955. He died in 1986.

References

20th-century Roman Catholic bishops in Canada
1905 births
1986 deaths
People from Goderich, Ontario
Roman Catholic bishops of Nelson